Edward Michael Egan (April 2, 1932 – March 5, 2015) was an American cardinal of the Roman Catholic Church. He served as bishop of the Diocese of Bridgeport in Connecticut from 1988 to 2000 and as archbishop of the Archdiocese of New York in New York City from 2000 to 2009. He was elevated to the cardinalate in 2001.

Early life and education
The third of four children, Edward Egan was born in Oak Park, Illinois, the son of Thomas J. and Genevieve (née Costello) Egan. His father was a sales manager and his mother was a homemaker and former teacher; his parents' families were from County Mayo and County Clare, Ireland. In 1943, Egan and his older brother contracted polio, causing them to miss two years of school while convalescing at home.

Egan attended Archbishop Quigley Preparatory Seminary in Chicago, where he was student body president and editor of the student newspaper and yearbook. After graduating from high school in 1951, he entered St. Mary of the Lake Seminary in Mundelein, Illinois, where he obtained a Bachelor of Philosophy degree. Egan was then sent to the Pontifical North American College in Rome, taking his academic courses in theology at the Pontifical Gregorian University.

Priesthood
Egan was ordained to the priesthood by Archbishop Martin O'Connor on December 15, 1957, for the Archdiocese of Chicago.

Egan was awarded a Licentiate of Sacred Theology from the Gregorian University in 1958. After returning to Chicago, he served as associate pastor of Holy Name Cathedral Parish, assistant chancellor for the archdiocese, and priest-secretary to Cardinal Albert Meyer. During this time, Egan also taught evening classes for potential Catholic converts and served as a chaplain at Wesley Memorial Hospital in Chicago.

In 1960, Egan returned to the Gregorian University in Rome to pursue his doctorate. During his studies, he became assistant vice-rector and repetitor of moral theology and canon law at the North American College. Egan received his doctorate in canon law summa cum laude in 1964. Back in Chicago, Egan was appointed priest-secretary to Cardinal John Cody. As his secretary, he "saw Cardinal Cody take the heat for good causes" such as the civil rights movement and desegregation.

Egan was later appointed secretary of the Archdiocesan Commissions on Ecumenism and Human Relations, sitting on several interfaith organizations and establishing dialogue with Jews and Protestants . From 1969 to 1971, he served as co-chancellor for the archdiocese. Egan returned to Rome in 1971 when Pope Paul VI named him an auditor of the Sacred Roman Rota.

While serving on the Roman Rota, Egan also served as a professor of canon law at the Gregorian University and of civil and criminal procedure at the Studio Rotale. Egan served as a commissioner of the Congregation for the Sacraments and Divine Worship and a consultor of the Congregation for the Clergy as well. In 1982, Egan was chosen to be one of the six canonists who reviewed the new Code of Canon Law with Pope John Paul II before its promulgation in 1983.

Episcopal career
On April 1, 1985, John Paul II appointed Egan as an auxiliary bishop of the Archdiocese of New York and titular bishop of Allegheny. He received his episcopal consecration at the Basilica of Saints John and Paul in Rome on May 22, 1985, by Cardinal Bernardin Gantin, with Archbishop John O'Connor and Bishop John Keating serving as co-consecrators. He selected as his episcopal motto: "In the Holiness of the Truth" Ephesians 4:24. As an auxiliary bishop, Egan served as vicar for education.

Bishop of Bridgeport
On November 5, 1988, John Paul II appointed Egan as the third bishop of the Diocese of Bridgeport. He was installed on December 14, 1988.

During his tenure, Egan oversaw the reorganization of Catholic schools. He also raised $45 million for diocesan schools through a fundraising campaign, "Faith in the Future." The diocesan Catholic Charities under his tenure became the largest private social service agency in Fairfield County, Connecticut. To support the 12 Hispanic parishes in the diocese, he brought Spanish-speaking priests to Bridgeport from Colombia. Egan also established a home for retired priests and a school for children with special needs.

Within the United States Conference of Catholic Bishops (USCCB), Egan served as chair of the board of governors of the Pontifical North American College and of the Committee on Science and Human Values. He was also a member of the Committee on Canonical Affairs, the Committee on Education, the Committee on National Collections, and the Committee on Nominations, and served two terms on the USCCB administrative board.

Archbishop of New York
John Paul II appointed Egan as archbishop of the Archdiocese of New York on May 11, 2000, a week after Archbishop O'Connor's death.  Egan was installed on June 19, 2000, with soprano Renée Fleming performing at the ceremony.

On becoming archbishop, Egan prioritized the encouragement of vocations to the priesthood. Besides private initiatives, each year on the Feast of St. Joseph (March 19), he offered a mass for prospective high school and college men.  Egan appointed two priests as vocation directors to aid him in promoting the priesthood, although they were unable to reverse the declining trend.

Egan was elevated to the cardinalate by John Paul II at the consistory of February 21, 2001, becoming the cardinal-priest of Ss. Ioannis et Pauli (Sts. John and Paul). As cardinal, one of Egan's main concerns was the archdiocesan seminary in Yonkers, New York. In March 2001, he announced the restructuring of the seminary faculty. A Staten Island pastor, Peter Finn, was chosen as seminary rector. Egan also added Avery Dulles, Sara Butler, and John DiNoia to the faculty. The minor seminary, then located in Riverdale, Bronx, was moved to the campus of the major seminary.

Egan was a prominent influence in New York City after the September 11, 2001 attacks at the World Trade Center. According to an article in Catholic New York:"The cardinal responded to the disaster – ministering to the injured and anointing the dead at St. Vincent's Hospital and at Ground Zero itself. He planned a center for victims' families at the New School and an interfaith service at Yankee Stadium.  Egan also offered masses at St. Patrick's Cathedral in the immediate aftermath of the attacks and funerals there and around the archdiocese for months."In 2002, the Institución del Mérito Humanitario in Barcelona, Spain awarded Egan the "Gran Cruz al Mérito Humanitario". Also in 2002, John Paul II named Egan and five other cardinals to the Supreme Tribunal of the Apostolic Signature, the church's highest court of Canon Law.

For retired priests, Egan established the John Cardinal O'Connor residence in 2003 at the previous site of the minor seminary in Riverdale. In June 2003, Egan was accused of concealing the names of priests who had been accused of child molestation, but found not guilty by the church. His spokesman argued that the innocent should be protected, while groups such as Voice of the Faithful criticized the process as being out of the public view.

Egan participated in the 2005 papal conclave that selected Pope Benedict XVI.  In December 2006, Egan began hosting a weekly program on The Catholic Channel of Sirius Satellite Radio in which he discussed a variety of topics, including events in the archdiocese and issues in the church. The channel also broadcast his Sunday mass from the cathedral.

On January 19, 2007, Egan announced that ten under-utilized parishes in the archdiocese would be canonically suppressed and eleven merged with other parishes, "based on the migration of Catholics in the inner-city to the outer boroughs". He also announced the establishment of five new parishes; three in Orange County, and one each in Staten Island and Dutchess County. Building projects were also approved for nine parishes. The closures caused some discontent.

On December 15, 2007, Egan celebrated his 50th anniversary as a priest. Pope Benedict XVI appointed him to the Congregation for the Oriental Churches on January 26, 2008. Egan then hosted the papal visit to New York during April 2008, marking the 200th anniversary of the diocese. In January 2009, Egan publicly condemned controversial statements made by Richard Williamson, an excommunicated Catholic bishop, about the reality of the Holocaust.

Resignation and final years
On April 2, 2007, Egan, offered his letter of resignation as archbishop of New York to Pope Benedict XVI, having reached the mandatory retirement age of 75.  Egan was the first archbishop of New York to retire; all previous archbishops of New York had died in office. Egan's resignation became official on February 23, 2009, when Benedict XVI appointed Archbishop Timothy Dolan as his successor. Dolan took possession of the archdiocese on April 15, 2009.

Egan served as a member of the board of trustees at the Catholic University of America in Washington, D.C., and a founding member of the board of governors at Ave Maria School of Law in Naples, Florida.  He reached age 80 on April 2, 2012, and from then on ceased to be cardinal-elector.

Egan was admitted to St. Vincent's Hospital in Manhattan on April 4, 2009, experiencing stomach pains. After testing, he was released on April 7, and was later given a pacemaker in a low-risk surgery. He was well enough to preside over major liturgical services for the April 9th to 12th Easter Triduum, days before the arrival of his successor.

Death and legacy

Egan died on March 5, 2015, at NYU Langone Medical Center in Manhattan of cardiac arrest. and his death was publicly announced by Cardinal Dolan. Many bishops released statements mourning Egan's abrupt death. From March 9 to the morning of March 10th, Egan's body lay in state at St. Patrick's Cathedral.  It was flanked by an honor guard of members of the New York City Police Department, Fire Department of New York, Knights of Columbus, Knights and Ladies of Malta and Knights and Ladies of the Holy Sepulchre.

On March 10, a Mass of Christian Burial for Egan was celebrated by Cardinal Dolan at St. Patrick's. After the mass, Egan's body was interred in the crypt of the cathedral beneath the high altar. The mass was attended by bishops from around the United States, Cardinals William Levada, Justin Rigali, Sean O'Malley, Roger Mahony, Daniel Dinardo, and then cardinal, now disgraced and defrocked, Theodore McCarrick.  The apostolic nuncio, Carlo Maria Viganò, read a letter from Pope Francis. The mass was attended by then New York Mayor Bill de Blasio and former mayors Michael Bloomberg, Rudy Giuliani and David Dinkins, along with then Governor Andrew Cuomo.

Views and controversies

Abortion
In an article published next to a photo of a fetus in the womb, Egan compared tolerating abortions to the reasoning used by Adolf Hitler and Joseph Stalin to commit mass murders.  Egan believed that Catholic politicians who support abortion rights for women should be forbidden communion on grounds of public scandal.  In April 2008, after newspapers had published photographs of Giuliani receiving communion at a mass in St. Patrick's Cathedral offered by Pope Benedict XVI, Egan issued a public statement:
The Catholic Church clearly teaches that abortion is a grave offense against the will of God. Throughout my years as Archbishop of New York, I have repeated this teaching in sermons, articles, addresses, and interviews without hesitation or compromise of any kind. Thus it was that I had an understanding with Mr. Rudolph Giuliani, when I became Archbishop of New York and he was serving as Mayor of New York, that he was not to receive the Eucharist because of his well-known support of abortion. I deeply regret that Mr. Giuliani received the Eucharist during the Papal visit here in New York, and I will be seeking a meeting with him to insist that he abide by our understanding.

Gay marriage
Egan assailed the notion of same-sex marriage and criticized Hollywood for "desecrating" marriage and destroying "something sacred and holy." Egan said the specter of legal same-sex marriage would have a devastating effect on traditional values already eroded by a crude pop culture, the New York Daily News reported.

Alleged abuse in Bridgeport

The Connecticut Supreme Court ruled in May 2009 that records detailing allegations of sexual abuse by priests in the Diocese of Bridgeport should be released. The court's 4-1 ruling covers more than 12,600 pages of documents from 23 lawsuits against six priests that have been under seal since the Diocese of Bridgeport settled the cases in 2001.

In April 2002, in a letter read out at mass, Egan apologized saying, "If in hindsight we also discover that mistakes may have been made as regards prompt removal of priests and assistance to victims, I am deeply sorry." Ten years later, in February 2012, Egan retracted his apology. In an interview with Connecticut Magazine, he said: "I never should have said that," and "I don't think we did anything wrong." He repeatedly denied that any sexual abuse happened while he was leading the Diocese of Bridgeport.

In August 2018, Reverend Boniface Ramsey said that he once tried to speak with Egan concerning the sexual activities of then-cardinal McCarrick, but that Egan "didn't want to hear it." McCarrick maintained his innocence but the Vatican found him guilty of sexual abuse crimes and laicized him.

In October 2019, former Connecticut Superior Court Judge Robert Holzberg released the results of his investigation, commissioned by Bishop Frank Caggiano, into the diocese's handling of accusations of sexual abuse by its priests. Holzberg found that all three of Bridgeport's bishops over forty years had consistently failed to fulfill their moral and legal responsibilities.

Holzberg found that Egan took a "dismissive, uncaring, and at times threatening attitude toward survivors"; he characterized Egan's behavior as "profoundly unsympathetic, inadequate, and inflammatory". Holzberg said that Egan broke a 1971 state law by not reporting abuse allegations and that he deliberately concealed the reasons for abusive priests' transfers. Among other findings, in a July 12, 1993, letter to diocesan counsel Renato Ottaviani, explaining his refusal to seek the involuntary laicization of serial abuser Reverend Raymond Pcolka, Egan wrote:"... it is obvious that there can be no canonical process either for the removal of a diocesan priest from his priestly duties or for the removal of a priest from his parish when there is serious reason to believe that the priest in question is guilty of the sexual violation of children, and especially when he has confessed such a violation to the bishop or a delegate of the bishop. For the bishop who would countenance such a process would be opening the way to the gravest of evils, among them the financial ruin of the diocese which he is to serve."

Clerical celibacy
In a radio interview given on March 10, 2009, at the end of his tenure as archbishop, Egan stated that clerical celibacy in the Latin Rite could be open to discussion. He added, "I think it has to be looked at, and I'm not so sure it wouldn't be a good idea to decide on the basis of geography and culture—not to make an across-the-board determination." He further noted that Eastern Rite priests are allowed to marry, with "no problem at all."

Egan later moderated his statement, saying, "Celibacy is one of the Church's greatest blessings. I will have to be more careful about trying to explain a somewhat complicated matter in 90 seconds."

References

External links

 Official biography - Roman Catholic Archdiocese of New York
 
 

1932 births
2015 deaths
People from Chicago
People from Oak Park, Illinois
University of Saint Mary of the Lake alumni
Pontifical Gregorian University alumni
American Roman Catholics
American Roman Catholic clergy of Irish descent
Roman Catholic bishops of Bridgeport
Roman Catholic archbishops of New York
Burials at St. Patrick's Cathedral (Manhattan)
21st-century American cardinals
Cardinals created by Pope John Paul II
Catholic University of America trustees
Members of the Apostolic Signatura
Members of the Congregation for the Oriental Churches
Members of the Congregation for Bishops
People with polio
Members of the Order of the Holy Sepulchre
Catholics from Illinois
Ave Maria School of Law